Football Club Parsa Sanat Shargh Birjand is an Iranian association football club based in Birjand.

References

Football clubs in Iran
South Khorasan Province
Birjand
Association football clubs established in 2021
League 3 (Iran)